Aquilegia coerulea, the Colorado blue columbine, is a species of flowering plant in the buttercup family Ranunculaceae, native to the Rocky Mountains, USA. Aquilegia coerulea is the state flower of Colorado.

The Latin specific name coerulea (or caerulea)  means "sky blue".

Description
It is a herbaceous perennial plant often found at elevations of 2,100 to 3,700 m (6,900 to 12,100 ft). The flowers are very variable in color, from pale blue (as in the species name coerulea) to white, pale yellow and pinkish; very commonly the flowers are bicolored, with the sepals a different shade to the petals. They consist of five petals, five sepals and an ovary surrounded by 50 to 130 stamens. Five long spurs hang below the calyx and contain nectar at their tips, accessible only to hawkmoths. In addition to hawkmoths, pollinators for this flower include bumble-bees, solitary bees and syrphid flies. Its native habitats include moist woods and open mountain meadows.

Distribution
It is native to Colorado, south eastern Idaho, southern Montana, Wyoming, northern New Mexico, and Utah.

Cultivation
Aquilegia coerulea is used as an ornamental plant in gardens.
Its natural variability is exploited in the selection of numerous cultivars in different shades. Cultivars include 'Origami'
 and 'Crimson Star'.

Gallery

References

External links

 Photos of 
 Colorado state flower
 Aquilegia coerulea Genome sequencing
 

coerulea
Flora of Colorado
Flora of the Rocky Mountains
Garden plants of North America
Symbols of Colorado